Maarit Lalli (born 4 April 1964) is a Finnish film director, film producer and screenwriter.

Career

On 3 February 2012, Lalli won three Jussi Awards for her first feature film Kohta 18 (2012); for Best Film, Best Director and Best Screenplay. Lalli wrote the screenplay with her son Henrik Mäki-Tanila who is also one of the main actors in the film. Her second film Kuudes kerta was released in January 2017.

Filmography

Films
Kohta 18 (2012)
Kuudes kerta (2017)

Short films
Suojaviiva (1995)
Legio (1997)
Rippeitä (1999)
Kovat miehet (1999)
Saaren vangit (2002)
Järvi (2006)
Keinu kanssain (2009)

On television
Tie Eedeniin (2003)
Käenpesä (2005–2006)
Sydänjää (2007–2010)
Mobile 101 (2022)

References

External links

1964 births
Finnish film directors
Finnish screenwriters
Living people
Finnish women film directors
Finnish women screenwriters